Jess Goldstein is an American costume designer. He has designed over 30 Broadway shows, including Jersey Boys,  Take Me Out and Proof.  He received a Tony Award for Best Costume Design for his work on the play The Rivals, in 2005.

He teaches at the Yale School of Drama.

External links 
 
 

Year of birth missing (living people)
Living people
American costume designers
Tony Award winners
Yale School of Drama faculty
Place of birth missing (living people)